Aguascalientes, Mexico, may refer to:

The state of Aguascalientes, one of the 32 component federal entities of the United Mexican States
Aguascalientes, Aguascalientes, capital city of that state